Lifespan Diabetes and Cardiometabolic Clinic is India’s first chain of specialty clinics in diabetes and cardiometabolic disorders. Lifespan Clinic was voted as 'India’s Most Promising & Valuable Diabetes-Cardiometabolic Clinic Chain 2014' at Pharma leaders 2014 Power Brand, Asia’s largest conference for healthcare professionals.

Founder
Ashok Jain (Jan 1957 -  Aug 2017), quit his CEO post at Cadbury Schweppes, where he held senior management positions for two decades, to set up Lifespan Clinic. It is positioned across the country as a one-stop for all the needs of diabetics.

Initiatives
On the eve of World Diabetes Day 2013, Lifespan conducted an initiative called ‘The Blue Circle Challenge’ where road shows and outdoor activities were conducted to spread diabetes awareness.

Headquarters
The headquarters of Lifespan Diabetes and Cardiometabolic Clinics is based in Mumbai. It is located near Worli Sea Face (North).

Expansion
Lifespan currently has 40 clinics majorly functional in Mumbai, Bengaluru, Hyderabad, Indore and Ahmedabad. Lifespan has plans to establish 100 new clinics in 30 major cities in India. It has also collaborated with franchise India for expansion.

References

External links
Oxygen Group Official Site
Apnnews.com
Youtube.com
Youtube.com
Youtube.com

Diabetes organizations
Clinics in India